Aerospike may refer to:

 Aerospike engine, a rocket engine without a traditional rocket nozzle
 Drag-reducing aerospike, a device which reduces drag on missiles by creating a detached shock above the missile
 Aerospike (database), an open-source noSQL database
 Aerospike (company), a technology company based in Mountain View, California, US